The Monte Alpi oil field is an oil field located in the region of the Southern Apennines. It was discovered in 1981 and developed by Eni. It began production in 1996 and  produces oil.

References

Oil fields in Italy